Lesbian was a  cargo ship which was built by Swan, Hunter and Wigham Richardson Ltd, Newcastle upon Tyne in 1923 for Ellerman Lines Ltd. She was seized in 1940 by the Vichy French forces.

History
Lesbian was built by Swan, Hunter and Wigham Richardson Ltd as yard number 1211. She was launched on 31 July 1923 and completed in September 1923. Lesbian was the third Ellerman Lines ship to bear that name. She was named after the inhabitants of Lesbos, Greece.

On 24 May 1925, Lesbian ran aground at Kephez, Turkey. She was refloated on 27 May 1925.

Lesbian was operated by Ellerman Lines Ltd until 1937. From 1937 until her capture in 1940, Lesbian was operated under the management of Ellerman & Papayanni Lines Ltd.

War service
Lesbian was a member of a number of convoys during the Second World War.

OG 1

Lesbian was a member of Convoy OG 1, which formed at sea on 2 October 1939 and was destined for Gibraltar. She was carrying a general cargo bound for Piraeus, Greece.

HG 7

Lesbian was a member of Convoy HG 7, which departed Port Said, Egypt on 3 November 1939 and arrived at Liverpool on 22 November. She was carrying a general cargo and also fruit.

HG 17

Lesbian was a member of Convoy HG 17, which departed Gibraltar on 1 February 1940 and arrived at Liverpool on the 11 May. She was on a voyage from Alexandria, Egypt to Liverpool.

HGF 28

Lesbian was a member of Convoy HGF 28, which departed Gibraltar on 26 April 1940 and arrived at Liverpool on 5 May.

Capture, sinking and rediscovery
In 1940, Lesbian was impounded by Vichy French forces at Beirut, Lebanon. During the Allied invasion of Syria and Lebanon in 1941, Beirut was bombed. The Vichy French, fearing that she would be sunk and block the port, took Lesbian a short distance offshore and scuttled her on 14 July 1941.

In 2000 the ship was discovered by two local diving centres, the National Institute for Scuba Diving (NISD) and the Abyss Dive Center.

Propulsion
The cylinders were 18, 31½ and 54 inches (457, 800 and 1,372 mm) diameter by  stroke. She could make .

Official number and code letters
Official Numbers were a forerunner to IMO Numbers.

Lesbian had the UK Official Number 147232 and used the Code Letters KPNH until 1933 and GJXK until 1940

References

External links
 Video of a dive on the wreck of SS Lesbian (8m 3s)

Steamships
Ships built on the River Tyne
Military of Vichy France
World War II merchant ships of the United Kingdom
World War II shipwrecks in the Mediterranean Sea
1923 ships
Ships of the Ellerman Lines
Maritime incidents in 1925
Maritime incidents in July 1941
Maritime incidents in Lebanon
Ships built by Swan Hunter